Charlotte Baker may refer to:

 Charlotte Johnson Baker (1855–1937), American physician
 Charlotte Baker (historian) (1833–1909), American historian, journalist, and teacher